Clifton Aqueduct, built in 1796, carried the Manchester, Bolton and Bury Canal across the River Irwell in Clifton, near Manchester, England. It is preserved as a Grade II listed structure.  The aqueduct is constructed of dressed stone with brick arches. Three segmental arches with keystones rest on triangular-ended cutwaters. Above the cutwaters are flat Pilasters. A C20 brick parapet remains on the eastern side. There is a towpath on each side, and the aqueduct contains grooves for stop planks to be inserted, to drain the canal.  The aqueduct was engineered by Charles Roberts and John Nightingale.

The aqueduct is one of two remaining along the canal route, the other being Prestolee Aqueduct. The canal is undergoing restoration and was previously hoped to be in operation around 2020.

As of December 2020, the aqueduct is currently not in water. 
The canal is very overgrown and showing signs of severe deterioration.

Rail Access
The nearest station is Clifton (Manchester) railway station.

See also

Listed buildings in Swinton and Pendlebury
Canals of the United Kingdom
History of the British canal system

References

External links

Clifton Aqueduct on Pennine Waterways website
Manchester, Bury & Bolton Canal Society website

Grade II listed bridges in Greater Manchester
Bridges completed in 1796
Navigable aqueducts in England
Grade II listed canals
Buildings and structures in the City of Salford
Bridges across the River Irwell
1796 establishments in England